"We Fell in Love in October" is a song by Norwegian indie rock singer-songwriter Girl in Red. It was released as a single on 21 November 2018 as a double single with "Forget Her". The song peaked at No. 14 on the US Hot Rock Songs chart in October 2019. The young girl with Girl in Red in the music video is Mina Rodahl.

In 2022, Girl in Red released the song “October Passed Me By" as a sequel to "We Fell in Love in October".

This song, along with the song "Girls" by the same artist, are widely considered within queer circles, especially the lesbian community, to be gay anthems.

Credits and personnel 
Credits adapted from Tidal:

 Marie Ulven – producer, composer, lyricist

Charts

Certifications

References

2018 singles
2018 songs
Girl in Red songs
Songs written by Girl in Red